Tom Flanigan (born April 27, 1953) is an American politician. He was a member of the Missouri House of Representatives from 2009 to 2017. He is a member of the Republican Party.

References

1953 births
Living people
21st-century American politicians
People from Carthage, Missouri
Republican Party members of the Missouri House of Representatives